is the remains of a castle structure in Shūnan, Yamaguchi Prefecture, Japan. Its ruins have been protected as a Prefectural Historic Sites. It is located on a 217 meter mountain.

Wakayama castle was built by the Sue clan, one of the most important retainers of the Ōuchi clan and became a home castle of the Sue clan in the Sengoku period. Sue Harukata improved and strengthened the castle before the Tainei-ji incident.

The castle was attacked by the Mōri clan soon after the Battle of Miyajima, Harukata's son Nagafusa was defeated and he committed seppuku. It is believed the castle was demolished by the Mōri clan after the fall of the castle.

References

Castles in Yamaguchi Prefecture
Historic Sites of Japan
Former castles in Japan
Ruined castles in Japan
Ōuchi clan